Quantum-Systems GmbH is a German technology company headquartered near Munich. Founded in 2015, it specializes in the development, design and production of small Unmanned Aircraft Vehicles (UAV), also known as drones. The fixed-wing drones combine flight times of up to 90 minutes with the ability to take off and land vertically (VTOL). The drones can cover an area of up to 700 hectares in one flight.

By integrating various high-precision sensors, numerous data feeds can be captured from the air. This simplifies decision-making processes for professional users in the agricultural, mining, and construction industries, as well as for military and security forces.

Quantum-Systems' drones combine the advantages of multi-rotor drones and fixed-wing drones in a patented [DE201210104783] automatic transition aircraft through swiveling rotors. The handling of a helicopter and the efficient aerodynamics of an airplane are combined in one system.

Products

Tron Series 
The Tron was the first electric VTOL (eVTOL) fixed-wing UAS developed, produced, and sold by Quantum-Systems. It became the platform for all succeeding developments of Quantum-Systems. Tron can carry payloads and sensors with a weight of up to 2 kg.

It was discontinued in December 2020.

Trinity Series 

The Trinity It is a 5 kg battery-electric drone with a 2.4 m wingspan that can fly for 90 minutes in temperatures ranging from -12 °C to +50 °C, with a cruise speed of 70 km/h.

The first Trinity prototype had its maiden flight in 2016. The serial production of Trinity started in 2018. The Trinity is the flagship of the Quantum-Systems fleet. It features three VTOL transition tilt-rotors along with the company's modular payload systems to match its 700 g payload capacity, and a foamed fuselage to optimize weight, cost, and performance.

Vector & Scorpion Series 

Serial production of the Vector and Scorpion 2-in-1-System started in 2020. The Vector is made of carbon-fiber-reinforced material, which makes it more resistant to various weather conditions, responding to high-quality requirements and standards of governmental customers from the defense and security sector. Scorpion is a short-range endurance tricopter. Both UAS share the same fuselage.

09/2020: Auterion partners with Quantum-Systems to bring to market Vector, a rucksack-portable tactical drone.

Operators

References

External links 
 

2015 establishments
Organisations based in Munich
Unmanned aerial vehicle manufacturers of Germany